Early Years, Vol. 2 is an album by American musician Hank Williams, Jr. This album was released on October 6, 1998 on the Curb Records label.

Track listing
 "Feelin' Better"  – 4:00
 "She's Still the Star (On the Stage of My Mind)"  – 2:31
 "Honey, Won't You Call Me"  – 2:50
 "Building Memories"  – 2:35
 "New South"  – 4:19
 "Long Way to Hollywood"  – 2:59
 "Angels Get Lonesome Sometimes"  – 2:58
 "Montgomery in the Rain"  – 3:55
 "Looking at the Rain"  – 3:39
 "You Love the Thunder"  – 3:30

External links
 Hank Williams, Jr's Official Website
 Record Label

1998 compilation albums
Hank Williams Jr. compilation albums
Curb Records compilation albums